The Peck–Bowen House is a historic house located at 330 Fairview Avenue in Rehoboth, Massachusetts.

Description and history 
It is a modest -story, Cape style cottage, five bays wide, with a side gable roof and central chimney. An ell, added around 1910, extends to the rear. The interior retains original features, including beaded chair rails and fireplace mantels. The house was built c. 1770–80, although its early ownership is uncertain. It may have belonged to members of the Peck family who operated an iron forge and grist mill nearby.

The house was listed on the National Register of Historic Places on June 6, 1983.

See also
National Register of Historic Places listings in Bristol County, Massachusetts

References

Houses in Bristol County, Massachusetts
Buildings and structures in Rehoboth, Massachusetts
Houses on the National Register of Historic Places in Bristol County, Massachusetts
Georgian architecture in Massachusetts
Federal architecture in Massachusetts